Lagaip-Porgera District (also spelled local as Lagaip-Pogera District) is a district of the Enga Province of Papua New Guinea.  Its principal towns are Laiagam and Porgera.

Administrative subdivisions
The district is divided into four Local Governments:
Lagaip Rural
Maip-Mulitaka Rural
Paiela-Hewa Rural
Porgera Rural

Demographics
The population of the district was 158,873 at the 2011 census.

Climate
The average tempiture is 44.6°F . The warmest month is December, at 50°F, and the coolest month is February, at 35.6°F. The average rainfall 124.96 inches per year.

Gallery

References

Districts of Papua New Guinea
Enga Province